Roy Aleksandrovich Medvedev (born 14 November 1925) is a Russian political writer. He is the author of the dissident history of Stalinism, Let History Judge, first published in English in 1972.

Biography 
Medvedev was born in Tbilisi, Transcaucasian SFSR, Soviet Union. He had an identical twin brother, the biologist Zhores Medvedev, who died in 2018. From a Marxist viewpoint, Roy criticized former Soviet General Secretary Joseph Stalin and Stalinism in general during the Soviet era. In the early 1960s, Medvedev was engaged in samizdat publications. He was critical of the unscientific nature of Lysenkoism.

Medvedev was expelled from the Communist Party in 1969 after his book Let History Judge was published abroad. The book criticized Stalin and Stalinism at a time when official Soviet propagandists were trying to rehabilitate the former General Secretary. Let History Judge reflected the dissident thinking that emerged in the 1960s among Soviet intellectuals who sought a reformist version of socialism like Medvedev. Along with Andrei Sakharov and others, he announced his position in an open letter to the Soviet leadership in 1970. In a book co-authored with his twin brother, Zhores, A Question of Madness, Medvedev describes Zhores' involuntary commitment in the Kaluga Psychiatric Hospital (see Political abuse of psychiatry in the Soviet Union). Zhores, a dissident biologist, was questioned in the hospital about his involvement with samizdat, and his book The Rise and Fall of T.D. Lysenko. Zhores was exiled to Britain in the 1970s.

Medvedev rejoined the Communist Party in 1989, after Mikhail Gorbachev launched his perestroika and glasnost program of gradual political and economic reforms. He was elected to the Soviet Union's Congress of People's Deputies and was named as member of the Supreme Soviet, the permanent working body of the Congress. Following the collapse of the Soviet Union in 1991 Medvedev and dozens of other former communist deputies of the Soviet and Russian parliaments founded the Socialist Party of Working People, and became a co-chair of the party. In 2008, Medvedev wrote a biography of Vladimir Putin where he gave his activities as president a positive evaluation.

Publications in English 
 Books
 Let History Judge: The Origin and Consequences of Stalinism, Alfred A. Knopf, New York, 1972 
 On Socialist Democracy, Alfred A. Knopf, New York, 1975, 
 Problems in the Literary Biography of Mikhail Sholokhov, Cambridge University Press, 1977
 Khrushchev, Blackwell, Oxford, Doubleday, New York, 1983, 
 The October Revolution, Columbia University Press, New York, 1979,  
 All Stalin's Men, Blackwell, Oxford, 1984, 
 A Question Of Madness  (with Zhores Medvedev).  Alfred A. Knopf, New York.  1971   
 Khrushchev:  The Years in Power (with Zhores Medvedev).  198 pages.  Columbia University Press, 1976, 
 On Soviet Dissent Columbia University Press, 1979, 
 Philip Mironov and the Russian Civil War (with  Sergei Starikov), Alfred A. Knopf, 1978, 
Leninism and Western Socialism Verso, 1981, 
 Nikolai Bukharin:  The Last Years.  176 pages.  W. W. Norton & Company, 1983, 
 Let History Judge:  The Origins and Consequences of Stalinism (Revised and expanded edition), Columbia University Press, 1989, 
 Post-Soviet Russia:  A Journey Through the Yeltsin Era (with George Shriver), 394 pages, Columbia University Press, 2002, 
 The Unknown Stalin (with Zhores Medvedev), The Overlook Press, 336 pages, 2004, 
 China and the Superpowers. Basil Blackwell. Oxford, 1986, 

 Articles

References 

 Inside Russia Today.  David K. Shipler.

Further reading 
 
 
 
 
 
Medvedev, Roy (1971). Let History Judge - English translation 
 

1925 births
Living people
Writers from Tbilisi
Saint Petersburg State University alumni
Russian political writers
Russian communists
Soviet dissidents
Soviet reformers
Russian twins
Expelled members of the Communist Party of the Soviet Union
Stalinism-era scholars and writers
Russian studies scholars
Soviet psychiatric abuse whistleblowers
Members of the Congress of People's Deputies of the Soviet Union
Members of the Supreme Soviet of the Soviet Union